Remy Ryan (born January 24, 1984) is an American actress. She is best known for playing Nikko in RoboCop 3 (1993).

Filmography

External links
 

1984 births
Living people
20th-century American actresses
21st-century American actresses
Actresses from Los Angeles
American child actresses
American film actresses
American television actresses
Hispanic and Latino American actresses